Istiklal Mosque may refer to one of the following:
 Istiklal Mosque, Sarajevo
 Istiqlal Mosque, Jakarta